The Thomas Kennedy House, in Bourbon County, Kentucky near Paris, Kentucky, was built in 1785.  It was listed on the National Register of Historic Places in 1980.

It was built by Thomas Kennedy (1744-1827), one of Bourbon County's earliest settlers.

It is located southeast of Paris on Paris-Winchester Rd.

References

National Register of Historic Places in Bourbon County, Kentucky
Houses completed in 1785
1785 establishments in Virginia
Houses on the National Register of Historic Places in Kentucky
Pre-statehood history of Kentucky